Pekon may refer to the following places:

Pekon Gayam, a village in South Sumatra, Indonesia
Pekon Township, a township in Shan State, Myanmar
Pekon, Myanmar, principal town of Pekon township